"Jelly Jungle (of Orange Marmalade)" is a song written and composed by Paul Leka (who also produced it) and Shelly Pinz. It was the final chart hit by the 1960s Ohio-based rock group The Lemon Pipers.

Released in the spring of 1968, it spent five weeks on the U.S. Billboard Hot 100, peaking at No. 51, and seven weeks on the Cash Box Top 100, peaking at No. 30. It reached No. 26 in Australia and No. 20 in Canada.

The song contains psychedelic imagery, mostly focused on the color orange:  marmalade jelly jungle, sunshine boy, rainbow ladder, yellow ball of butter, fluffy parachute clouds, tangerine dreams, pumpkin drum, carrot trumpets, and violins growing like peaches.

Chart performance

References

External links
 Lyrics of this song
 

1968 songs
1968 singles
Songs about music
Song recordings produced by Paul Leka
Songs written by Paul Leka